The Melbourne to Warrnambool Classic cycling race is a one-day road bicycle race. The race started in 1895 and is Australia's oldest one day race and the world's second oldest one day race, after the Liège–Bastogne–Liège Classic.  Historically until 1938 the race started in Warrnambool and finished  later in Melbourne. In 1895 the race was run in the opposite direction, from Melbourne to Warrnambool and then again from 1939. The route started in the Melbourne central business district and followed the Princes Highway to Warrnambool on Victoria's western coast. This traditional route was the longest race on the Union Cycliste Internationale (UCI) calendar, the exact distance varying slightly over time.

The race was a handicap event from 1895 to 1995, with riders leaving Melbourne at different intervals. In the towns on route there are now sprint points to be earned for a sprint champion competition. With six climbs during the day, a King of the Mountains championship is also at stake.

While the race usually attracts Australia's best locally based road cyclists, the increasing number of Australians racing for European-based professional teams have rarely entered since 2010. The race is also open to amateur club cyclists who race for the prizes in the secondary grades, or just to finish before the designated cutoff time.

Several additional hills were added to the route near Camperdown. The primary difficulty of the race remains its length and the strong crosswinds which affect the course. There was no race in 2018 as the event moved from its October date in 2017 to be held in February 2019. The course was also changed, starting at Avalon Airport, through Geelong, Winchelsea, Colac and Port Campbell, before finishing in Warrnambool.

History
In 1895 Don Charlston conceived the first race after riding from Warrnambool to Melbourne in a personal time trial. The first race was held on  5 October 1895 and won by New Zealander Andrew Calder in 11 hours 44 minutes, with a two-hour handicap start for the 165-mile trip. He suffered a puncture near Geelong which lost him 20 minutes, but crossed the line with a lead of 31 minutes. The fastest time during this first race was recorded by Jim Carpenter from scratch who took 10 hours 52 minutes and finished in 4th place. Of the 50 riders that entered, 24 started and only 7 finished the race. A second race occurred ten weeks later over the same distance.

Riders attended from all over Australia and New Zealand. From 1902 the fastest NSW rider in the Goulburn to Sydney Classic was selected to appear for NSW. In 1923 a sprint point was introduced for the first . The first winner was Jack Beasley from Fitzroy in what was claimed as a world record time of  4h 37' 57". In 1927 the Warrnambool to Melbourne was replaced by the Dunlop Grand Prix, a  race over four stages, with the 4th stage being from Warrnambool to Melbourne. In 1934 the Warrnambool to Melbourne was again replaced by a stage race, the Centenary 1000, a 1,102 miles (1,773 km) race over seven stages, with the 1st stage being from Melbourne to Warrnambool. From 1947 to 1949 the title of long-distance road champion of Australia was awarded at a sprint point  into the race. From 1950 the Australian national road race title was run as a separate event.

Olympic medal winning cyclist, Dean Woods, set the race record time of 5 hours and 12 minutes in 1990 over the shorter distance than the race is presently  in 1990.

In 1995 a monument commemorating the race winners was unveiled near the finish line on Raglan Parade, Warrnambool by two times Blue Riband Winner, Sir Hubert Opperman. An honour board was added in 2001 in acknowledgement of the many volunteers involved in the race.

The first woman known to have entered the race was Pauline Walters in 1979. She did not complete the race on her first attempt, but in 1980 Walters and Beryl Burton became the first two women to finish the race. In 2015, the Melbourne to Warrnambool established a separate category for female entrants in an effort by Cycling Victoria to make cycling more female friendly.  In 2022, a separate women's race, the Warrnambool Women's classic, was added. The inaugural Women's Warrnambool Classic in 2022 was won by Maeve Plouffe.

In 2021 the race was scheduled for 13 February. However, the day before the race it was postponed due to a snap lockdown declared by the Victorian government to control a coronavirus outbreak. The race was rescheduled to 1 May.

Winners 1895–1995

Male Winners 1996 onwards
From 1996 the race was run as a scratch race.

Female Winners
From 2015 females were awarded official prizes.

Women's Warrnambool Cycling Classic Winners
From 2022 a separate race for women was held.

Notes

References

External links
Official website
A guide to riding the Warny (2006)
The 2006 course route

Cycling events in Victoria
Cycle races in Australia
Sports competitions in Melbourne
UCI Oceania Tour races
Recurring sporting events established in 1895
Warrnambool
1895 establishments in Australia